Hyperaeschra tortuosa is a species of prominent moth in the family Notodontidae. It was described by J. G. O. Tepper in 1881 and is found in North America.

The MONA or Hodges number for Hyperaeschra tortuosa is 7918.

References

 Lafontaine, J. Donald & Schmidt, B. Christian (2010). "Annotated check list of the Noctuoidea (Insecta, Lepidoptera) of North America north of Mexico". ZooKeys, vol. 40, 1–239.

Further reading

 Arnett, Ross H. (2000). American Insects: A Handbook of the Insects of America North of Mexico. CRC Press.

External links

 Butterflies and Moths of North America
 NCBI Taxonomy Browser, Hyperaeschra tortuosa

Notodontidae
Moths described in 1881